In the psychology of defense mechanisms and self-control,
acting out is the performance of an action considered bad or anti-social. In general usage, the action performed is destructive to self or to others. The term is used in this way in sexual addiction treatment, psychotherapy, criminology and parenting. In contrast, the opposite attitude or behaviour of bearing and managing the impulse to perform one's impulse is called acting in.

The performed action may follow impulses of an addiction (e.g. drinking, drug taking or shoplifting). It may also be a means designed (often unconsciously or semi-consciously) to garner attention (e.g. throwing a tantrum or behaving promiscuously). Acting out may inhibit the development of more constructive responses to the feelings in question.

In analysis 
Freud considered that patients in analysis tended to act out their conflicts in preference to remembering them – repetition compulsion. The analytic task was then to help "the patient who does not remember anything of what he has forgotten and repressed, but acts it out" to replace present activity by past memory.

Otto Fenichel added that acting out in an analytic setting potentially offered valuable insights to the therapist; but was nonetheless a psychological resistance in as much as it deals only with the present at the expense of concealing the underlying influence of the past. Lacan also spoke of "the corrective value of acting out", though others qualified this with the proviso that such acting out must be limited in the extent of its destructive/self-destructiveness.

Annie Reich pointed out that the analyst may use the patient by acting out in an indirect countertransference, for example to win the approval of a supervisor.

Interpretations 
The interpretation of a person's acting out and an observer's response varies considerably, with context and subject usually setting audience expectations.

In Parenting

Early years, temper tantrums can be understood as episodes of acting out. As young children will not have developed the means to communicate their feelings of distress, tantrums prove an effective and achievable method of alerting parents to their needs and requesting attention.

As children develop they often learn to replace these attention-gathering strategies with more socially acceptable and constructive communications. In adolescent years, acting out in the form of rebellious behaviors such as smoking, shoplifting and drug use can be understood as "a cry for help." Such pre-delinquent behavior may be a search for containment from parents or other parental figures. The young person may seem to be disruptive – and may well be disruptive – but this behaviour is often underpinned by an inability to regulate emotions in some other way.

In Addiction
In behavioral or substance addiction, acting out can give the addict the illusion of being in control. Many people with addiction, either refuse to admit they struggle with it, or some don't even realize they have an addiction. For most people, when their addiction is addressed, they become defensive and act out. This can be a result of multiple emotions including shame, fear of judgement, or anger. It's important to be patient and understanding towards those with addiction, and to realize that most people want to break free from the symptoms and baggage that come with addiction, but don't know how or where to start. There are many preventative measures and programs than can help those who personally struggle with addiction, or for those who have a friend or family member that has an addiction.

In Criminology

Criminologists debate whether juvenile delinquency is a form of acting out, or rather reflects wider conflicts involved in the process of socialization.

Alternatives 

Acting out painful feelings may be contrasted with expressing them in ways more helpful to the patient, e.g. by talking out, expressive therapy, psychodrama or mindful awareness of the feelings. Developing the ability to express one's conflicts safely and constructively is an important part of impulse control, personal development and self-care.

See also

References

Further reading
Franz Alexander, 'The Neurotic Character' International Journal of Psychoanalysis XI 1930

External links
 Schellekes, S. About acting out at https://www.hebpsy.net , 2007.
 Acting out Psychological Term From http://www.betipulnet.co.il

Psychology
 Acting Up is Not "Acting-Out" Dr George Simon at CounsellingResource.com
 "Projective Identification, Countertransference, and the Struggle for Understanding Over Acting Out" Robert T. Waska, M.S., MFCC, Journal of Psychotherapy Practice and Research 8:155-161, April 1999
 Sophie de Mijolla-Mellor, 'Acting out/Acting-in'

Self-help
 Acting out More complete explanation from a psychological perspective.
 Acting out Understanding acting out from outsiders and insider's perspectives, suggestions for developing positive potential from acting out traits.

Parenting
 Acting out

Barriers to critical thinking
Criminology
Defence mechanisms
Forensic psychology
Problem behavior
Youth
Youth rights